El Teatro Campesino (Spanish for "The Farmworker's Theater") is a Chicano theatre company in California. Performing in both English and Spanish, El Teatro Campesino was founded in 1965 as the cultural arm of the United Farm Workers and the Chicano Movement with the "full support of César Chávez." Originally based in Delano, California, during the Delano Strike, the theatre is currently based in San Juan Bautista, California.

Currently, El Teatro Campesino’s mission is “…to create a popular art with 21st century tools that presents a more just and accurate account of human history, while encouraging the young women and men of a new generation to take control of their own destiny through creative discipline, vibrant education, economic independence, and artistic excellence.”

History 

Luis Valdez, along with Agustin Lira (Teatro de la Tierra), founded the troupe. After attending San Jose State University and working briefly with the San Francisco Mime Troupe, Luis Valdez met Agustin Lira,a local Chicano with theatrical experience who had already hit upon the idea of using theater as an organizing tool in the fields and was already involved in the United Farmworkers Union in Delano.

Teatro Campesino's early performances drew on varied traditions, such as commedia dell'arte, Spanish religious dramas adapted for teaching Mission Indians, Mexican folk humor, a century-old tradition of Mexican performances in California, and Aztec and Maya sacred ritual dramas.

El Teatro Campesino started as the cultural wing of the United Farm Workers union in California's central valley, to help raise both Mexican workers and American people awareness of the Delano grape strike controversies during the two years of the strike (1965 – 1967). Although the troupe began by entertaining the farmworkers, within a year of their founding they began to tour to raise funds for the striking farm workers. While being relocated to Del Rey, California and then Fresno, California from 1967-1971, their subject matter had expanded to include aspects of Chicano culture that went beyond the fields: education, the Vietnam War, indigenous roots, and racism. The work of the theater has been considered by critics of Chicano art, such as Holly Barnet-Sanchez, as a "major catalyst for an explosion of Chicano/a arts."

Modern era
In 1971, they moved their headquarters to San Juan Bautista and adapted traditional religious plays La Virgen del Tepeyac and La Pastorela for Christmas celebrations. As Chicano culture received unprecedented attention in the United States, Valdez received national attention, and taught drama at the University of California, Berkeley and University of California, Santa Cruz.

In 1973 they worked with British theater director Peter Brook; in 1976 they toured the play La Carpa through Europe, sponsored by the U.S. State Department.

The company continues their yearly Christmas pageants, alternating annually between La Virgen del Tepeyac and La Pastorela. They also did revivals of Valdez's play Zoot Suit in 2002 and 2007 at their playhouse, as well as a Southwestern tour of the production in 2004.

See also
 Mission San Juan Bautista
 Diane Rodriguez

Notes
  Organizational history, UCSB site.
  Organizational history, UCSB site.
  Organizational history, UCSB site.

References

"El Teatro Campesino: An Interview with Luis Valdez" by Carl Heyward
Broyles-Gonzalez, Yolanda. Teatro Campesino: Theater in the Chicano Movement. Austin : University of Texas Press, 1994. 
"Organizational history" from the California Ethnic and Multicultural Archives

External links
Official site
Guide to the El Teatro Campesino Archives 1964-1988 at the California Ethnic and Multicultural Archives at the UC Santa Barbara Library
El Teatro Campesino Video Collection on ImaginArte

San Juan Bautista, California
California culture
Mexican-American organizations
Mexican-American culture in California
1965 establishments in California
Theatre companies in California